Dundee University Medics RFC is a rugby union club based in Dundee, Scotland. They most recently won Caledonia Midlands Two in the 2021-22 Season.

History

The club was founded in 2001  and was in student developmental leagues before it joined the regional league structure of the Scottish Rugby Union in 2013.

It is not affiliated to Dundee University but does share resources and some players with Dundee University RFC.

In 2019, around 70% of its side were medical students but this percentage has fallen year on year, although the majority still are.

Dundee University Medics have a fine record in playing in the SRU Midlands Bowl. They have been finalists in 4 successive seasons.

They reached the final in 2016–17, losing to Blairgowrie RFC.

They reached the final again in 2017–18, losing out to Panmure RFC. The final that year was coined the ‘Snow Bowl’, as the 'Beast from the East' covered the pitch in deep snow, requiring both teams joining to clear the field, allowing the game to be played.

They beat Panmure 39-19 the following year. As a result, they progressed to the National Bowl. They then beat Glasgow University Medics in the semi-final of the National Bowl by 17–19, but narrowly lost out 36–31 toAberdeenshire RFC in the 2018–19 National Bowl final at BT Murrayfield.

The team reached the Midlands Bowl Final of 2019-20 but were beaten by Kinross RFC.

Due to Winning Caledonia Midland 2 in 2021–22, the team will compete in the National Shield competition for the 2022–23 season.

Honours

 Caledonia Midlands 3
 Champions (1): 2017-18
 Caledonia Midlands 2 
Champions (1): 2021-22
 Midlands Regional Bowl
 Champions (1): 2018-19
 Runners up (3) :2016-17, 2017–18, 2019–20
National Bowl
 Runners Up: 2018-19

Notable former players
 Former Captains
 2016-17: Callum Sreenan
 2017-18: Zac Slevin
 2018-19: Ewen Cullen
 2019-20: Connell Grieve
 2020-22: Toby Hughes
 2022-23: Kieren Cutler

-->

References

Rugby union in Dundee
Scottish rugby union teams
University and college rugby union clubs in Scotland